The Special Recognition Award is presented by the Academy of Science Fiction, Fantasy and Horror Films, in conjunction with their annual Saturn Award ceremony.

Recipients
Below is a list of recipients and the year the award was presented:

Marc Cushman – These Are the Voyages... (2014)
Don Mancini - Child's Play/Chucky (2018)

References

External links
 Saturn Awards - Special Award Recipients

Saturn Awards